Kenneth Bryn Thomas (1915–1978) was an English physician and president of the History of Medicine Society of the Royal Society of Medicine from 1970 to 1972.

Selected publications
 James Douglas of the Pouch and his pupil William Hunter (Pitman Medical Publishing Co, London, 1964)
 Curare: its history and usage (Pitman Medical Publishing Co, London, 1964)
 "The A Charles King Collection of early anaesthetic apparatus", Anaesthesia, vol xxv, no 4 (Oct 1970)
 The development of anaesthetic apparatus: a history based on the Charles King collection of the Association of Anaesthetists of Great Britain and Ireland (published for the Association by Blackwell Scientific Publications, Oxford, 1975).

References 

Presidents of the History of Medicine Society
1915 births
1978 deaths
English anaesthetists
British medical historians
British medical writers
Presidents of the Osler Club of London